Ukraine used to attract more than 20 million foreign citizens every year (23 million in 2012). But since 2014 this has lowered to about 10 million. Visitors primarily come from Eastern Europe, but also from Western Europe as well as Turkey and Israel.

Before the Russo-Ukrainian War Ukraine occupied 8th place in Europe by the number of tourists visiting, according to the World Tourism Organization rankings. Ukraine has numerous tourist attractions: mountain ranges suitable for skiing, hiking and fishing: the Black Sea coastline as a popular summer destination; nature reserves of different ecosystems; churches, castle ruins and other architectural and park landmarks; various outdoor activity points. Kyiv, Lviv, Odesa and Kamyanets-Podilskyi were Ukraine's principal tourist centres each offering many historical landmarks as well as formidable hospitality infrastructure. Tourism used to be the mainstay of Crimea's economy, but there was a major fall in visitor numbers following the Russian annexation in 2014.

The Seven Wonders of Ukraine and Seven Natural Wonders of Ukraine are the selection of the most important landmarks of Ukraine, chosen by the general public through an Internet-based vote.

Ukraine is a destination on the crossroads between central and eastern Europe, between north and south. It borders Russia and is not far from Turkey. It has mountain ranges – the Carpathian Mountains suitable for skiing, hiking, fishing and hunting. The coastline on the Black Sea is a popular summer destination for vacationers. Ukraine has vineyards where they produce native wines, ruins of ancient castles, historical parks, Orthodox, Catholic and Protestant churches as well as a few mosques and synagogues. Kyiv, the country's capital city has many unique structures such as Saint Sophia Cathedral and broad boulevards.  There are other cities well known to tourists, such as the harbour town Odesa and the old city of Lviv in the west. Most of Western Ukraine, which used to be within the borders of the Republic of Poland before World War II, is a popular destination for Poles. Crimea, a little "continent" of its own, had been a popular vacation destination for tourists for swimming or sun tanning on the Black Sea with its warm climate, rugged mountains, plateaus and ancient ruins, though the tourist trade has been severely affected by Russia's occupation and annexation of the territory in 2014. Cities there include: Sevastopol and Yalta – location of the peace conference at the end of World War II. Visitors can also take cruise tours by ship on the Dnieper River from Kyiv to the Black Sea coastline. Ukrainian cuisine has a long history and offers a wide variety of original dishes.

The country's tourism industry is generally considered to be underdeveloped, but it does provide crucial support for Ukraine's economy. Ukraine does have certain advantages, including much lower costs than other European destinations, as well as visa-free access for most people from Europe, the former Soviet Union, and North America. Since 2005 citizens of European Union and EFTA, United States, Canada, Japan and South Korea no longer require a visa to visit Ukraine for tourism purposes. Additionally, no visa is required from most countries of the former Soviet Union with the exceptions of Russia and Turkmenistan.

Popular tourist city destinations

Central Ukraine 

Main cities
 Kyiv – The historical capital of Kyivan Rus and modern Ukraine on the river Dnipro. Ancient churches, broad boulevards, beautiful landscapes and a variety of cultural facilities make it fascinating destination.
 Chernihiv – ancient city of Kyivan Rus, one of the oldest cities in Ukraine, has lots of Medieval architecture. Some of the oldest human settlements in Europe have also been discovered in the area.
 Pereiaslav – "living museum", one of the biggest History and Ethnography Reserve in Ukraine. There are over 20 different museums, city hosts various exhibitions and fairs.
 Vinnytsia – the largest city in the historic region of Podillia. In Vinnytsia there is the largest floating fountain in Europe, built in the river Southern Bug near Festivalny Isle.
 Sumy – city's history started in the mid-17th century.

Western Ukraine 

 Lviv – old city in the west of country, with its medieval old town and unique architecture with Polish and Austrian influences. The top tourist destination in Ukraine, when it comes to architecture and culture.
 Ivano-Frankivsk – western Ukrainian city that was recognized as the best city to live in Ukraine.
 Chernivtsi – the capital of Bukovina offers Balkan atmosphere and fine classical Habsburg architecture in Central-European style, as it was part of Austrian empire (prior to 1918).
 Uzhhorod – the capital of Transcarpathia, one of the oldest cities in Ukraine, attracts tourists because of its proximity to the Carpathian Mountains.
 Mukacheve
 Kamianets-Podilskyi
 Ternopil
 Lutsk
 Drohobych

Eastern Ukraine 

 Kharkiv – city's history started in the mid-17th century, when the Cossacks created the Sloboda settlements; and since then, the city has turned into one of the largest commercial, cultural and educational centers in Ukraine with a population of over 1.7 million people. From December 1919 to June 1934, Kharkiv was the capital of Soviet Ukraine. The Ukrainian cultural renaissance commenced here in the years 1920–1930.
 Sviatohirsk and Bakhmut
 Donetsk
 Luhansk

Southern Ukraine 
 Odesa – a harbor city on the Black Sea with a mixture of different cultures, including Jewish, Armenian, German, Russian and Greek cultures along with the native Ukrainian culture. Odesa is Black Sea resort and the largest trading center of Ukraine.
 Zaporizhia – the sixth largest city in Ukraine, famous by Khortytsia island, DniproHES and "Sotsgorod" (Socialistic city).
 Izmail – a historic town near the Danube river in the Odesa Oblast (province) of south-western Ukraine.
 Crimean Southern Coast (Crimean Riviera) - a coastline of Yalta and Alushta municipalities (currently under administration of the Russian Federation)
 Sevastopol (currently under administration of the Russian Federation)

Landscapes
 Carpathian Mountains – impressive mountain landscapes with skiing and hiking possibilities, spas with cold and hot springs. Ski resorts include Bukovel, Slavske, Verkhovyna, Vorokhta.
 Hoverla – the highest mountain in Ukraine. Hiking.
 Azov coast – bathing resorts.
 Dnieper – cruises.
 Dniester – canoeing, boat sailing.
 Shatsk lakes – bathing, camping, hiking.
 Sofiyivsky Park, located in Uman, Ukraine.
 Waterfalls of Ukraine – ecotourism.

Seven Wonders of Ukraine

The Seven Wonders of Ukraine are the seven historical and cultural monuments of Ukraine, which were chosen in the Seven Wonders of Ukraine contest held in July 2007.
 Sofiyivsky Park in Uman, Cherkasy Oblast
 Kyiv Pechersk Lavra (Monastery of the Caves)
 Kamianets-Podilskyi Historical Complex in Kamianets-Podilskyi, Khmelnytskyi Oblast
 Khortytsia in Zaporizhia, Zaporizhia Oblast
 Chersonesos in Sevastopol
 Saint Sophia's Cathedral, Kyiv
 Khotyn Fortress in Khotyn, Chernivtsi Oblast

Seven natural wonders of Ukraine

Winners of all Ukraine competition Seven natural wonders of Ukraine:

 Askania-Nova near Askania-Nova, Kherson Oblast
 Granite-steppe lands of Buh in Mykolaiv Oblast	
 Dniester Canyon, Dnister
 Marble Cave (Crimea)
 Tovtry Podillian Banks in Khmelnytskyi Oblast	
 Lake Svitiaz part of a group of lakes near Shatsk, Volyn Oblast	
 Lake Synevyr near village of Synevyrska Poliana in Carpathian Mountains

Recognized World Heritage sites

 Kyiv Pechersk Lavra (Kyiv Caves Monastery) and Saint Sophia's Cathedral
 Lviv city historic centre (mainly Old Town)
 Residence of Bukovinian and Dalmatian Metropolitans (Chernivtsi)
 Ruins of Chersonesus in Sevastopol
 Segments of the Struve Geodetic Arc
 Ancient and Primeval Beech Forests in Ukrainian Carpathians
 Wooden tserkvas of the Carpathian region

Medical tourism
Lately many modern dental clinics with high quality dentistry equipment and high quality materials have been established in Ukraine. They provide patients with high quality dentistry services for prices much cheaper in comparison with Western and Russian clinics. Many tourists from United States, European Union and Russia arrive for dental services, providing a sort of dental tourism.

Other popular sorts of medical tourism in Ukraine are soas, eye and plastic surgery, hair transplants, and mud baths.

Truskavets and Myrhorod are well known for their mineral springs.

Religious tourism
Uman is a pilgrimage site for Breslov Hasidic Jews, especially on Rosh Hashana kibbutz.

Events

Festival culture

In recent years a variety of festivals emerged in major Ukrainian cities. Among the most popular are international jazz festival in Lviv, street food festival in Kyiv, various summer festivals in Odesa—a popular tourist destination in summer. Many of these festivals take place in former industrial buildings of the Soviet era and are thus helping to rejuvenate these areas.

Trade fairs

Governing body of tourist industry and its chairs
 Main Directorate of Foreign Tourism (at the Government of the Ukrainian SSR and part of the Soviet Goskominturist)
 1964–74 Yosyp Zatyahan
 1974–89 Viktor Dobrotvor
 Ukrintur Association
 1989–93 Volodymyr Skrynnyk
 State Committee of Ukraine on tourism
 1993–96 Volodymyr Skrynnyk
 1997–98 Anatoliy Kasianenko
 1998–2000 Valeriy Tsybukh
 State Department of Tourism (State Committee of Youth Policy, Sport and Tourism)
 2001–02 Anatoliy Matviyenko
 State Tourist Administration of Ukraine
 2002–05 Valeriy Tsybukh
 State Service of Tourism and Resorts (Ministry of Culture and Tourism)
 2005–06 Ihor Prystavskyi
 2006–10 Anatoliy Pakhlya
 State Agency of Ukraine on Tourism and Resorts (Ministry of Infrastructure)
 2011–14 Olena Shapovalova
 Department (Directorate) of Tourism and Resorts (Ministry of Economic Development and Trade)
 2016–17 Ivan Liptuha
 2018–2019 Oksana Serdyuk
 State Agency for Tourism Development of Ukraine (Ministry of Сulture and Іnformation Policy of Ukraine)
 2019–present Mariana Oleskiv

Rules of entry to Ukraine 
Due to the situation with COVID-19, the rules of entry to Ukraine have changed significantly. For tourists planning to travel to Ukraine, it is important to familiarize yourself with the list of documents required to enter the country, for example, such as a document confirming the receipt of a full course of vaccination against COVID-19, a negative result of an express test for the determination of the SARS-CoV-2 coronavirus antigen or a negative result PCR test.

Foreign travel statistics

Number of foreign citizens visiting Ukraine (from 2014, excluding Crimea)
Statistics are based on data from the State Statistics Agency of Ukraine.

 2000: 6.4 million
 2001: 9.2 million
 2002: 10.5 million
 2003: 12.5 million
 2004: 15.6 million
 2005: 17.6 million
 2006: 18.9 million
 2007: 23.1 million
 2008: 25.4 million
 2009: 20.8 million
 2010: 21.2 million
 2011: 21.4 million
 2012: 23.0 million
 2013: 24.7 million
 2014: 12.7 million
 2015: 12.4 million
 2016: 13.3 million
 2017: 14.2 million

Gallery

See also

 List of museums in Ukraine
 List of places named after people (Ukraine)
 List of UNESCO World Heritage Sites in Ukraine
 Seven Wonders of Ukraine
 Biosphere reserves of Ukraine
 Lists of Nature Reserves of Ukraine
 National Parks of Ukraine
 Transport in Ukraine
 Ukrainian cuisine
 Ukrainian culture
 Ukrainian historical regions
 Visa policy of Ukraine
 Wooden churches in Ukraine

References

External links

 Official Tourism Portal in Ukraine

 
 Tourism in Ukraine: list of interesting places
 Travel website about Ukraine

 
Economy of Ukraine
Ukrainian culture
Ukraine
Ukraine